Henry F. Spaulding Coachman's House is a historic home located at Riverdale, The Bronx in New York, New York.  It was built about 1880 and is representative of the Stick-Eastlake style.  The main section is a -story cottage dwelling with board and batten siding.  It features jigsaw ornament, twin chimneys, and a polychromed slate roof.

It was listed on the National Register of Historic Places in 1982.

References

Houses on the National Register of Historic Places in the Bronx
Queen Anne architecture in New York City
Houses completed in 1880
History of the Bronx
Houses in the Bronx
Riverdale, Bronx